Sri Aurobindo Siksha Sadan is a public school located in Birati, West Bengal.

History
The school was established in the year 1989 and is affiliated to the West Bengal Board of Secondary Education and the West Bengal Council of Higher Secondary Education. It is guided by the principles of Sri Aurobindo.

Academics
At the higher secondary level, the three streams of Science, Commerce and Arts are taught here.

See also
Education in India
List of schools in India
Education in West Bengal

References

External links

Schools in North 24 Parganas district
1989 establishments in West Bengal
Educational institutions established in 1989
Schools affiliated with the Sri Aurobindo Ashram
High schools and secondary schools in Kolkata